Misbahul Islam Laskar is an Indian politician. He was elected to the Assam Legislative Assembly from Barkhola in the 2021 Assam Legislative Assembly election as a member of the Indian National Congress. He previously served from 1996 to 2006. He served as the Minister of Cooperation and Tourism from 2001 to 2006 in Tarun Gogoi's first cabinet. He also served as the chairman of Assam Minority Development Board.

References

Indian National Congress politicians from Assam
Year of birth missing (living people)
Living people
Assam MLAs 2021–2026
People from Cachar district